Tarzoon: Shame of the Jungle is a 1975 French/Belgian adult animated comedy film. It is a parody of the 1932 film Tarzan the Ape Man directed by cartoonist Picha and Boris Szulzinger. The film was the first foreign-animated film to receive an X rating in the United States.

An English dub was released in 1979 where the English cast consists of Johnny Weissmuller, Jr. (the son of noted Tarzan actor Johnny Weissmuller), with comedians John Belushi, Bill Murray, Christopher Guest, and Brian Doyle-Murray.

This film is also known as Jungle Burger in the United Kingdom.

Plot
The film takes place in the deepest part of Africa. The evil, bald, and multi-breasted Queen Bazonga, who resides in a blimp, inside a cave shaped like a woman’s legs spread open revealing her vagina, plans to conquer Earth. Before she can do that, however, she wishes to have a full set of hair so people can take her seriously. Her two-headed assistant, called the Charles of the Pits, suggests a "scalp transplant", an experiment where someone else's hair is transplanted to another person's head. Bazonga demands that she wants the hair of June, the maid of Shame: Ruler of the jungle. Bazonga sends out her penis soldiers to kidnap June.

Meanwhile, that night, June kicks out Shame from their home after another night of unsuccessful sex. She ends up sleeping with Flicka, Shame's monkey pal. The next morning, Bazonga's soldiers barge in and kidnap June, but only after they have an orgy with her. Shame hears June's screams and comes to her rescue, but he is too late. Shame eventually decides to save his mate and immediately sets out on his quest with Flicka.

As he swings through the jungle, an airplane crashes in a giant mud pit, containing a crew of four explorers set out to find Shame. The crew include the eccentric Professor Cedric Addlepate, the ditzy Stephanie Starlet, the grumbling Brutish (who only wants to find Shame for fame), and his assistant Short, a nervous black man. As the crew wander through the jungle, they eventually find Shame. Before they can get acquainted, Brutish and Short step in to take Shame back to the plane, leaving the Professor to be eaten alive by savage monkeys known as "Molarman" while Stephanie is tied up to a tree. The Molar Men catch up with Brutish and Short and eat them both. They free Shame from the cage, but only to try to eat him. Shame is saved by a beer-guzzling fratboy named Craig Baker who flies on a carpet run by a flock of birds. After a lengthy conversation with Shame, Craig gets drunk and falls off the carpet. Shame also falls off, but is saved by Flicka.

Shame and Flicka eventually make it to Bazonga's lair. Flicka is told to stay behind while Shame goes to get June. He has caught Bazonga's soldiers while they were on a practice drill. Shame is taken to Bazonga, who tries to convince Shame to join her side and rule the world with her. Shame says he only wants June, which enrages Bazonga. Shame runs off to find June, who is about to receive the scalp transplant from the bickering Charles of the Pits. Bazonga's soldiers try to stop Shame, which results in the blimp moving and main generator exploding, which sets the place on fire. Bazonga cannot escape from the fire in her office. Shame sees this and saves her by igniting the Emergency Fire Alarm, which sends out more of Bazonga's soldiers to cover themselves in condoms and dive inside Bazonga's vagina until she explodes. One of the heads on the Charles of the Pits kills the other while in a heated conversation. Shocked by this, the other head sets June free. They try to escape, but the Charles of the Pits is killed by acid semen shooting all over the place.

Shame eventually finds June, who keeps bickering to Shame while they find a way to escape the blimp, as it drills its way out of the cave and flies all around the jungle. The two find an emergency two-seated parachute, and spring out of the blimp, which finally crashes onto Bazonga's cave, destroying it forever. As June kisses Shame for his bravery, they both spot Stephanie Starlet, who becomes the leader of the Molar Men, and plans to conquer Hollywood.

Cast

Additional Voices
 John Belushi (Craig Baker)
 Deya Kent
 M. Vernon
 Tony Jackson
 John Baddeley

Production
The film contains the zeuhl song "Tarzoon's March", which was written and performed by Teddy Lasry of the band Magma, featuring lyrics sung in Kobaïan.

A 15-minute pilot was shown at the 1974 Cannes Film Festival, and the film was finished by September 1975. The following year, the estate of Edgar Rice Burroughs sued the producer of Tarzoon and 20th Century Fox, the film's distributor in France, for alleged plagiarism. The estate lost the case after the French court determined the film was a legitimate parody.

In 1978, the film was imported into the United States by International Harmony and Stuart S. Shapiro. Shapiro recalls telling customs that the film was a work in progress and it would be edited to be suitable for theatrical release in the U.S. He did not remember any problems bringing the film into the country. The distributor encountered problems finding theaters willing to show the X rated version of the film. The film ended up making a profit in San Francisco, but was largely unsuccessful in other towns. Much of its success was credited to International Harmony's ad campaign created by writer Edwin Heaven who, similar to Cinemation with Fritz the Cat, used the film's disadvantage (rated X) to its marketing advantage; radio ads and giant posters plastered all over San Francisco proclaimed: "YOU'RE GOING TO LAUGH YOUR X OFF!"

Eventually, the film was reedited and dubbed. After several changes, the distributor persuaded the MPAA to change the film's rating to an R. The R-rated version of the film featured new dialogue written by Michael O'Donoghue of Saturday Night Live and the voices of several notable actors and comedians such as John Belushi, Adolph Caesar, Brian Doyle-Murray, Judy Graubart, Bill Murray and Johnny Weissmuller Jr.

The Burroughs estate filed another lawsuit demanding that the name of the film be changed when their lawyer found a New York State statute covering disillusion of trademark. They argued that Tarzan was a wholesome trademark and that the current product degraded the character's name. A judge agreed. The suit was filed three weeks into the film's New York run. The title was shortened to Shame of the Jungle, and the "Tarzoon" character name was altered by cutting the name out of the soundtrack negative and splicing it back into the soundtrack upside down. According to Shapiro, this version of the film did not do as well at the box office since audiences were attracted to the "Tarzoon" name.

Home media
The film was released on VHS by Media Home Entertainment in 1979. Then on Anamorphic Widescreen DVD in the UK by Lace DVD on 31 January 2011.

Reception

Critical reception
The R-rated version of the film received negative reviews. Vincent Canby of The New York Times said that the film was an "unsuccessful attempt to parody the life and adventures of Edgar Rice Burroughs' Tarzan." Tam Allen in The Village Voice called the film "an uncomfortably accurate reflection of that civic eyesore known as toilet art," and compared it unfavorably to Fritz the Cat and Down and Dirty Duck. Playboy praised the film's artwork, but felt that the film became "monotonous after a good start – still, in the off-the-wall category, the most literate prurient and amusing challenge to community standards since Fritz the Cat."

Censoring
The film was banned by the New Zealand Board of Censors in 1976.

References

External links

 
 
 

1975 films
1975 animated films
1970s satirical films
1970s sex comedy films
1970s French animated films
Adult animated comedy films
Belgian sex comedy films
French sex comedy films
Tarzan parodies
1970s French-language films
Belgian animated films
Belgian satirical films
Films directed by Picha
Films directed by Boris Szulzinger
1975 comedy films
Film controversies
Obscenity controversies in film
Obscenity controversies in animation
French adult animated films